NCAA Season 86 is the 2010–11 season of the National Collegiate Athletic Association of the Philippines. The host for this year will be San Sebastian College–Recoletos (SSC–R).

The official theme and slogan that will be used this upcoming season will be San Sebastian 2010 NCAA: Youth Speaks @ 86!

Probationary member schools
After being guest schools in the 2009-10 season, Arellano University and Emilio Aguinaldo College were accepted as probationary members for this season. Angeles University Foundation backed out on being a probationary member.

Basketball

The centerpiece event, the seniors' basketball tournament will begin on June 26 at the Araneta Coliseum in Quezon City. Instead of the traditional opening day where all teams will play, only four teams will do, although the tradition of the champion team playing the host school in the second game will still be done, with host school and defending champions San Sebastian Stags going up against last season's hosts and dethroned champions San Beda Red Lions. The first Sunday games in league history were played the next day at the Filoil Flying V Arena in San Juan. This was made in deference to June 30, the day of the inauguration of President Benigno Aquino III. After that, games will be played on Monday, Wednesday and Friday, with the juniors games tipping off at 10:00 a.m. and the seniors at 2:00 p.m.

Seniors' tournament

Elimination round

Bracket

Juniors' tournament

Elimination round

Bracket

Volleyball

Women's tournament
The semifinals in the women's division was restarted after the league forfeited all the games that April Ann Sartin and Ronnery dela Cruz of Perpetual Help and Arianne Yap and Janel Lim of St. Benilde played for eligibility violations. CSB's and Perpetual's games during the elimination round were also forfeited.

Elimination round

Season host is boldfaced
Sets won ratio

Semifinals

Finals

|-
|colspan=10 align=center|San Sebastian wins series 2–0
|}

Men's tournament

Elimination round

Season host is boldfaced.

Semifinals

Finals

|-
|colspan=10 align=center|UPHSD wins series 2–0
|}

Juniors' tournament

Elimination round

Season host is boldfaced.

Semifinals

Finals

|-
|colspan=10 align=center|UPHSD wins series 2–0
|}

Football

Men's tournament

First round

Second round

Schedule

Juniors' tournament

Elimination round

Season host is boldfaced.

Semifinals

Season host is boldfaced.

Beach Volleyball

Men's tournament
Season host is boldfaced.

Bracket

Finals

Juniors' tournament
Season host is boldfaced.

Bracket

Finals

Women's tournament
Season host is boldfaced.EAC advanced by virtue of a 2–0 win over Arellano during the elimination round.

Bracket

Finals

Chess

Seniors Division
Season host is boldfaced.
CSB won all of their games to become automatic champions.

Awardees
MVP: Joel Pimentel, Jr. (CSB)

Juniors' Division
Season host is boldfaced.

Finals

Awardees
MVP: Giovanni Mejia (LSGH)

Swimming

Seniors Division

Juniors Division

Women's Division (Demonstration Sport)

Table Tennis

Seniors Division
Season host is boldfaced.

Women's Division
Season host is boldfaced.

Juniors Division
Season host is boldfaced.

Taekwondo
The NCAA Taekwondo Championships was held on January 25, 2010 at Filoil Flying V Arena in San Juan.

Men's tournament

Women's tournament

Juniors' tournament

Lawn Tennis

Men's tournament

Juniors tournament

Cheerleading
The NCAA Cheerleading Competition was held on October 1, 2010 at the Filoil Flying V Arena. The affair was covered live by Studio 23 and was hosted by Gretchen Fullido and the various NCAA courtside reporters.

General Tally

Seniors' Division

Juniors' Division

General Championship race
Season host is boldfaced.

Note: This is as of February 22, 2011.

Juniors' Division

Seniors' Division

References

See also
UAAP Season 73

86
2010 in Philippine sport
2010 in multi-sport events
2011 in Philippine sport
2011 in multi-sport events